Candyman is an American supernatural horror-slasher film series originating from the 1985 short story "The Forbidden" of the collection Books of Blood by Clive Barker, about the legend of the "Candyman", the ghost of an artist and son of a slave who was murdered in the late 19th century. Its film adaptation, Candyman, directed by Bernard Rose in 1992, starred Tony Todd as the title character. Although the film initially underperformed at the American box office, it became a cult classic. A novelization 
and a comic adaptation of the film were released in the same year. Two sequels, Candyman: Farewell to the Flesh (1995) and Candyman: Day of the Dead (1999), were released. A direct sequel to the original Candyman (set in the same continuity as all previous films), directed by Nia DaCosta and produced by Jordan Peele, was released on August 27, 2021.

Films

Candyman (1992)

Candyman, the first film in the series, is a 1992 slasher film, serving as a loose adaptation of the Clive Barker's 1985 short story "The Forbidden" of the collection Books of Blood. The film follows a graduate student, Helen Lyle, who is studying urban legends along with her colleague Bernadette. She takes strong interest in learning about a mysterious hook-handed murderer coined as "The Candyman" in the Cabrini Green urban project dwelling which many of the residents feared he lived behind the mirrors and the walls of the apartments randomly killing them 'gutting' them with his hook after chanting his name 5 times in a mirror. Helen becomes intrigued by the mythical story that she jokingly summons him in denial and disbelief, later to learn who was really behind the mirror, questioning her reality.

Candyman: Farewell to the Flesh (1995)

Farewell to the Flesh is the second film in the series.  The film follows the story of a school teacher, Annie Tarrant, who comes to learn about her family's past after losing her father due to his obsession with the Candyman. She denies his existence after hearing her students talk about him and learning that one of her students was obsessed with him. She speaks his name to prove he does not exist, but later finds out who Candyman really is.

Candyman 3: Day of the Dead (1999)

Day of the Dead is the third film in the series. The story continues with Annie Tarrant's daughter, Caroline Mckeever, who is now an adult. She denies Candyman's existence by protecting her family's bloodline as her business partner Miguel uses the story of her Great Great Grandfather Daniel Robitaille/Candyman in his art exhibit for profit. Caroline soon learns why her mother tried to destroy the myth of Candyman but is caught between his web of deceptive murders, framing her in order for her to submit to become immortal as family with him in death.

Candyman (2021)

A fourth film in the series was produced by Metro-Goldwyn-Mayer and Monkeypaw Productions and was released on August 27, 2021. Yahya Abdul-Mateen II stars in the film, while Tony Todd returns to the eponymous role. It is a direct sequel to the first film, taking place twenty-seven years later, in Cabrini Green, Chicago. A young, over-confident visual artist named Anthony McCoy struggles to find inspiration to get him further exposure. He learns about an old urban legend that took place in the project housing developments at Cabrini Green of a grad student name Helen Lyle who became mentally insane during her research and sacrificed herself to save a baby, which sparks his interest. He further researches the information which leads him to encounter a neighborhood laundromat owner who also reveals his version of the urban legend, which is learned to be of an amputated hook-handed man in the 1970s named Sherman Fields who was wrongfully murdered at the hands of Chicago police officers which Cabrini Green residents believed him to be "The Candyman" who harmed children with razor blades in candy. Anthony becomes obsessed with these urban legend findings as he uses it for his artwork presentation and to influence the summoning of the spirit of 'The Candyman', but later realizes the consequences of his actions as he learns the real truth behind the legend by his hallucinations, which in turn becomes a deadly reality.

Unrealized projects
According to Virginia Madsen, Bernard Rose originally wanted the first sequel Candyman 2 to be a prequel showing Candyman and Helen's "look-alike" falling in love, but the idea was turned down because the studio was worried about how a fully-fledged interracial romance would be received. A possible fourth film was in development in 2004; according to Tony Todd, it was intended to be set in New England at a women's college, and focus on a professor who is a descendant of Candyman but has no idea who he is, with Todd describing "the initial image [being] of Candyman in a blizzard". The film was stuck in development hell. The slasher crossover film Freddy vs. Jason (2003) also inspired Miramax to want to create a Candyman vs. Hellraiser crossover, but Clive Barker, originator of both franchises, had recommended against it. A crossover with the Leprechaun film series was also considered, but Tony Todd immediately flat out refused to participate in such a project, saying he had too much respect for his character to see him used for such a purpose.

Cast and crew

Cast
 This table shows the characters and the actors who have portrayed them throughout the franchise.
 A dark grey cell indicates the character was not in the film, or that the character's presence in the film has not yet been announced.
 A  indicates an appearance as a younger version of a pre-existing character.
 A  indicates a photographic appearance.
 A  indicates a vocal appearance only.

Crew

Reception

Box office performance

Critical and public response

Music
Candyman (1992) and Candyman: Farewell to the Flesh soundtrack was composed by Philip Glass. According to Glass, "it has become a classic, so I still make money from that score, get checks every year". Tony Todd confirmed in an interview with IGN that a limited edition featuring 7500 copies of the film's soundtrack was released in February 2015. The composition "Candyman's Suite: Helen's Theme" became a widely popular theme song for Halloween and was often featured in a few television commercials and series including in one episode of American Horror Story: Asylum.

Candyman: Day of the Dead original score soundtrack was composed by Adam Gorgoni. 

Candyman (2021) original score soundtrack was composed by Chicago musician Robert Aiki Aubrey Lowe who used solo compositions based around voice and extended modular synthesis techniques. He expressed in an interview with fellow musician DeForrest Brown Jr. that he used field recordings of Cabrini Green to capture the essence and spirit of the neighborhood and layered it as textural elements on top of the main instruments. In January 2022, Variety reported that Candyman's film score, briefly made the shortlist for the 2022 Academy Awards in the category of Best Original Score, however did not make the official final ballot list. Phillips Glass score "Helen's Theme/Music Box" was also reimagined by Lowe as a new interpolation on the soundtrack as well as in one scene and end credits of the film.

Other media

Board game
A board game based on Candyman: Farewell to the Flesh was released during the mid 1990s as a promotional item for the film of the same name. The game features a board, 1 die and cards (Hook, Candyman, Voodoo, Mansion Key) that will impact the player or others. The game's premise is stated as "to win, player must proceed clockwise along the streets of New Orleans and get to the mansion with the key card in order to unlock the secret to Candyman's power".

References

External links

 Candyman franchise on IMDb
 Candyman franchise box office on The Numbers

 
Film series introduced in 1992
Slasher film series
Fiction about interracial romance
Erotic horror